Balavé  is a department or commune of Banwa Province in western Burkina Faso. Its capital lies at the town of Balavé. According to the 1996 census the department has a total population of 14,820.

Towns and villages
The largest towns and villages and populations in the department are as follows:

Balavé (4 700 inhabitants) (capital)
 Badinga	(1 948 inhabitants)
 Doga	(813 inhabitants)
 Gama	(735 inhabitants)
 Hasbialaye	(845 inhabitants)
 Lago	(611 inhabitants)
 Tangouna	(977 inhabitants)
 Yasso	(4 191 inhabitants)

References

Departments of Burkina Faso
Banwa Province